Oldbury is a hamlet and former civil parish about 2 miles from Atherstone, now in the parish of Hartshill, in the North Warwickshire district, in the county of Warwickshire, England. In 1961 the parish had a population of 82.

History 
The name "Oldbury" means 'Old fortification'. In 1866 Oldbury became a civil parish, on 1 April 1986 the parish was abolished and merged with Hartshill, Ansley and Mancetter.

References 

Hamlets in Warwickshire
Former civil parishes in Warwickshire
Borough of North Warwickshire